Jeffrey David Larish (born October 11, 1982) is an American former professional baseball infielder and outfielder. He played in Major League Baseball (MLB) for the Detroit Tigers and Oakland Athletics.

Amateur career
Larish attended McClintock High School. Larish was chosen by the Chicago Cubs in the 32nd round of the 2001 Major League Baseball Draft, but chose to attend college at Arizona State University. Larish was chosen by the Los Angeles Dodgers in the 15th round of the 2004 Major League Baseball Draft, but turned down a reported $660,000 contract offer at the advice of his agent, Scott Boras, so that he could complete college. On June 21, 2005, Larish became the third College World Series player in history to hit three home runs in a single game.

Professional career

Detroit Tigers
Larish was chosen by the Detroit Tigers in the fifth round (150th overall) of the 2005 MLB draft. In 2007, Larish was honored as the Tigers Minor League Player of the Year. On January 25, 2010, Larish was optioned to Triple-A Toledo. On July 25, 2010, Larish was recalled to the Detroit Tigers when Magglio Ordóñez and Carlos Guillen were sent to the disabled list. Larish had a Statue of Liberty batting stance. He stood straight up with absolutely no movement other than pushing off on his left leg as he began his swing. On July 30, Larish was designated for assignment by the Tigers and subsequently claimed off waivers by the Oakland Athletics.

Oakland Athletics
In August 2010, Larish was claimed off waivers by the Oakland Athletics. He was then assigned to the Sacramento River Cats. On August 6, 2010, Larish had 10 RBIs in a doubleheader sweep at Isotopes Park. The River Cats won both games, 14-5 and 12-3, respectively.

Philadelphia Phillies
On November 18, 2010, Larish signed a minor league contract with the Philadelphia Phillies. On July 14, 2011, Larish suffered a season-ending injury when he suffered a broken leg trying to score at home plate.

Baltimore Orioles
The Baltimore Orioles signed him to a minor league contract on February 3, 2012. However, he did not receive an invite to spring training. At the end of Spring Training, Larish was released by the Orioles.

Boston Red Sox
On May 4, 2012, Larish signed a minor league contract with the Boston Red Sox. He was traded by the Red Sox to the Pittsburgh Pirates on May 12, 2012, for cash considerations.

Pittsburgh Pirates
On May 12, 2012, he was purchased by the Pittsburgh Pirates. On September 3, 2012, playing for the Indianapolis Indians against the Louisville Bats, Larish attempted to play all nine positions. Larish began the game in left field, in the 2nd inning he was in center field, by the 3rd inning Larish was in right field. He played third base in the 4th, shortstop in the 5th, and second base in the 6th. He started the 7th inning at first base and became the pitcher with two outs in the inning. Larish failed to play catcher only because the game was shortened due to rain. Larish was credited with the save. In November 2012, he became a free agent. On November 9, 2012, he re-signed with the Pirates.  On August 3, 2013 he was released by the Indianapolis Indians.

International career
Larish played on the United States national baseball team in the 2003 Pan American Games; the team took the silver medal and went 27–2 overall, at the time its best finish ever. Larish scored the only run in the team's 3–1 loss in the final game to Cuba.

References

External links

1982 births
Living people
Arizona State Sun Devils baseball players
Baseball players at the 2003 Pan American Games
Baseball players from Iowa
Detroit Tigers players
Erie SeaWolves players
Gulf Coast Tigers players
Indianapolis Indians players
Lakeland Tigers players
Lehigh Valley IronPigs players
Leones del Caracas players
American expatriate baseball players in Venezuela
Major League Baseball first basemen
Major League Baseball third basemen
Mesa Solar Sox players
Oakland Athletics players
Oneonta Tigers players
Pan American Games medalists in baseball
Pan American Games silver medalists for the United States
Peoria Saguaros players
Sacramento River Cats players
Sportspeople from Iowa City, Iowa
Toledo Mud Hens players
United States national baseball team players
Medalists at the 2003 Pan American Games